= Leitturm =

Leitturm is a concrete bunker and antiaircraft tower in Vienna built by the Nazis during the Second World War. It is one of six such structures in Vienna and has, in modern times, come under controversy as to whether the towers should be demolished or preserved. The concrete towers are extensively fortified and were to be used as shelters in addition to platforms for antiaircraft cannons that were placed on top of the structures. The Leitturm is the best preserved example of the six towers.
